The Pirate's Gospel is the debut studio album by indie folk musician Alela Diane, originally self-released on CD-R in 2004. It was reissued by Holocene Music in 2006.

Track listing

2006 track listing

References

2006 debut albums
Alela Diane albums